John Robert Taylor (25 January 1884 – 22 October 1913) was a British swimmer. He competed in the men's 100 metre backstroke event at the 1908 Summer Olympics.

References

1884 births
1913 deaths
British male swimmers
Olympic swimmers of Great Britain
Swimmers at the 1908 Summer Olympics
Place of birth missing
British male backstroke swimmers